Fabrice Lokembo-Lokaso (born 31 October 1982) is a Congolese retired football defender of Congolese origin. He played for Enosis Neon Paralimni FC and had been given on loan for a year to Olympiakos Nicosia. In 2008, he moved to AEK Larnaca.

Club career
Lokembo-Lokaso played for R. Charleroi S.C. in the Belgian Jupiler League from 2002 through 2005.

In 2016, he was sentenced to 10 months' imprisonment by a court in Dunkerque, France for his part in a cross-Channel people-smuggling operation.

References

External links

1982 births
Living people
Footballers from Kinshasa
Democratic Republic of the Congo footballers
Belgian footballers
Democratic Republic of the Congo emigrants to Belgium
Enosis Neon Paralimni FC players
AEK Larnaca FC players
Expatriate footballers in Cyprus
Expatriate footballers in Israel
Association football defenders
Maccabi Petah Tikva F.C. players
Naturalised citizens of Belgium
Olympiakos Nicosia players
R. Charleroi S.C. players
Belgian Pro League players
Israeli Premier League players
Cypriot First Division players
RAAL La Louvière players
Belgian expatriate footballers
Belgian expatriate sportspeople in Cyprus
Belgian expatriate sportspeople in Israel
Democratic Republic of the Congo expatriate footballers
Democratic Republic of the Congo expatriate sportspeople in Cyprus
Democratic Republic of the Congo expatriate sportspeople in Israel